Rolf Sæther (born 20 May 1937) is a Norwegian shipping executive and writer.

He graduated with the cand.jur. degree from the University of Oslo in 1964. After some years as deputy judge in Mandal District Court and civil servant in the Ministry of Transport and Communications, he was hired in the Norwegian Shipowners' Association in 1968. He spent the rest of his career there, peaking at the position of chief executive from 1992 to 2002. He had then been director of international relations since 1980 and vice chief executive since 1985.

He has chaired Folketrygdfondet from 2002 to 2006 as well as the Norwegian Jockey Club, Norsk Rikstoto and the exclusive bibliophiles' society Bibliofilklubben. In 2009 he made a name as a non-fiction writer, when he released the book Tusen dager together with Jo Stein Moen. The book chronicles Norwegian involvement in the Spanish Civil War. The duo followed with Krigen som skapte et bibliotek, issued in 2011 by the Labour Movement Archive and Library, an essay book on the bibliography of the Spanish Civil War.

In 2002 he was decorated as a Knight, First Class of the Order of St. Olav. He resides in Huk.

References

1937 births
Living people
University of Oslo alumni
Norwegian businesspeople in shipping
Norwegian non-fiction writers
Historians of the Spanish Civil War
Norwegian bibliophiles